Nameless Lake is a lake in geographic Foster township in the Unorganized North Part of Sudbury District in Northeastern Ontario, Canada. The primary outflow is an unnamed creek to Elisabeth Lake, which flows via Brazil Creek and the Spanish River to Lake Huron.

References

Other map sources:

Lakes of Sudbury District